Richland Township is one of the thirteen townships of Wyandot County, Ohio, United States.  The 2010 census found 871 people in the township, 358 of whom lived in the village of Wharton.

Geography
Located in the western part of the county, it borders the following townships:
Ridge Township - north
Crawford Township - northeast corner
Salem Township - east
Mifflin Township - southeast corner
Jackson Township - south
Jackson Township, Hardin County - southwest
Delaware Township, Hancock County - west
Amanda Township, Hancock County - northwest

Two villages are located in Richland Township: Wharton in the center, and part of Forest in the southwest along the border with Hardin County.

Name and history
It is one of twelve Richland Townships statewide.

Government
The township is governed by a three-member board of trustees, who are elected in November of odd-numbered years to a four-year term beginning on the following January 1. Two are elected in the year after the presidential election and one is elected in the year before it. There is also an elected township fiscal officer, who serves a four-year term beginning on April 1 of the year after the election, which is held in November of the year before the presidential election. Vacancies in the fiscal officership or on the board of trustees are filled by the remaining trustees.

References

External links
County website

Townships in Wyandot County, Ohio
Townships in Ohio